The following is a list of Jewish political milestones in the United States.

First Jewish member of a colonial legislature (South Carolina): Francis Salvador (1775)
First Jewish soldier killed in the American Revolutionary War: Francis Salvador (1776)
First Jewish member of the U.S. Congress (U.S. House of Representatives): Lewis Charles Levin (1845)
First Jewish member of the U.S. Senate: David Levy Yulee (1845)
First Jewish mayor of a major American city (Portland, Oregon): Bernard Goldsmith (1869) 
 Two years later, Philip Wasserman succeeded him as mayor.
First Jewish governor of a U.S. state (California): Washington Bartlett (1887)
First Jewish U.S. Cabinet member (Secretary of Commerce and Labor): Oscar Straus (1906)
Not including Judah P. Benjamin, who served in the Confederate Cabinet as Secretary of State and Secretary of War.
First Jewish Justice of the U.S. Supreme Court: Louis Brandeis (1916)
President Millard Fillmore offered to appoint Judah P. Benjamin to the Supreme Court in 1853, but Benjamin declined.
First Jewish female member of the U.S. Congress (U.S. House of Representatives): Florence Prag Kahn (1925)
First Jewish Secretary of the Treasury: Henry Morgenthau Jr. (1934)
First person of Jewish ancestry to run for President of the United States on a major party ticket: Barry Goldwater (1964) (Goldwater's father was Jewish; Goldwater was raised Episcopalian)
 First person of Sephardic Jewish ancestry to run for President of the United States: Louis Abolafia (1968)
First Jewish candidate to receive an electoral vote for Vice President: Tonie Nathan of the Libertarian Party, from a faithless elector (1972)
First Jewish Secretary of Defense: James R. Schlesinger (1973)
First Jewish Secretary of State: Henry Kissinger (1973)
First Jewish Attorney General: Edward H. Levi (1975)
First Jewish female mayor of a major American city (Dallas): Adlene Harrison (1976)
First Jewish female governor of a U.S. state (Vermont): Madeleine M. Kunin (1985)
First Jewish openly gay member of the U.S. Congress (U.S. House of Representatives): Barney Frank (took office 1981, disclosed homosexuality 1989)
Jared Polis became the first Jewish Congressman to be openly gay upon first election: (2009)
First U.S. Senate election in which both major party candidates were Jewish: 1990 Minnesota U.S. Senate Election; with Paul Wellstone defeated Rudy Boschwitz (1990)
First independent Jewish member of the U.S. Congress (U.S. House of Representatives): Bernie Sanders (1991)
First Jewish female members of the U.S. Senate: Barbara Boxer and Dianne Feinstein (1993)
First Jewish female Justice of the U.S. Supreme Court: Ruth Bader Ginsburg (1993)
First Jewish female U.S. Cabinet member (Secretary of State): Madeleine Albright (1997) (also first woman Secretary of State)
Four years earlier, Albright became first Jewish female with U.S. Cabinet-rank status (U.S. Ambassador to the United Nations).
First Jewish nominee for Vice President of the United States on a major party ticket, and first Jewish candidate to receive an electoral vote, excluding faithless electors: Joe Lieberman (2000)
First Jewish U.S. House whip: Eric Cantor (2009) (also first Jewish whip in either chamber of Congress)
First Jewish U.S. House floor leader: Eric Cantor (2011) (also first Jewish floor leader and majority leader in either chamber of Congress)
First Jewish American to win a presidential primary (New Hampshire): Bernie Sanders (2016) (Barry Goldwater, the 1964 Republican presidential nominee, was the first winner of Jewish heritage, but was a Christian).
First Jewish American to receive an electoral vote for President: Bernie Sanders, from a faithless elector (2016) (Barry Goldwater was the first of Jewish heritage, in 1964, but was not Jewish)
First Jewish U.S. Senate floor leader: Chuck Schumer (2017) (also first Jewish minority leader in either chamber of Congress)
First Jewish member of the first family: Ivanka Trump (2017)
First Jewish daughter of a US President: Ivanka Trump (2016)
First Jewish Second Gentleman (and first Jewish American spouse of Vice President): Douglas Emhoff (2021)
First Jewish U.S. Senate majority leader: Chuck Schumer (2021)
First Jewish female (and the first woman) Secretary of the Treasury: Janet Yellen (2021)
First Jewish County Executive of Nassau County  New York Bruce Blakeman 2022

See also 
 List of Jewish American politicians

References

 
Political milestones
Political history of the United States
United States politics-related lists
United States
United States Jewish
 Political milestones in the United States

he:יהדות ארצות הברית#ציוני דרך